Eyioma Uwazurike (born May 6, 1998) is an American football defensive end for the Denver Broncos of the National Football League (NFL). He played college football at Iowa State.

Early life and high school
Uwazurike grew up in Detroit, Michigan and attended Southfield-Lathrup High School.

College career
Uwazurike redshirted his true freshman season due to academics. He became a starter during his redshirt freshman season and had  27 tackles, 5.0 tackles for loss, and one sack. In his first full season as a starter, Uwazurike recorded 32 tackles, 5.5 tackles for loss, and 1.5 sacks and was named honorable mention All-Big 12 Conference. He was again named honorable mention All-Big 12 as a redshirt senior after finishing the season with 27 tackles, eight tackles, and three sacks. Uwazurike decided to utilize the extra year of eligibility granted to college athletes who played in the 2020 season due to the coronavirus pandemic and return to Iowa State for a sixth season. He was named first-team in his final season after finishing the year with 43 tackles, 12 tackles for loss, and nine sacks.

Professional career
Uwazurike was drafted by the Denver Broncos in the fourth round, 116th overall, of the 2022 NFL Draft.

References

External links
Denver Broncos bio
Iowa State Cyclones bio

1998 births
Living people
American sportspeople of Nigerian descent
Players of American football from Detroit
American football defensive ends
American football defensive tackles
Iowa State Cyclones football players
Denver Broncos players